Henricus is a given name. People with the name include:

 Henry of Avranches (died 1260) (in Latin: Henricus Abrincensis or de Abrincis), French poet
 Henry (bishop of Finland) (allegedly died c. 1156) (in Latin: Henricus), English clergyman who may not have existed and, according to legend, died a martyr
 Henry of Friemar (c. 1285–1354), also known as Henricus de Vrimaria or Henricus de Frimaria, German Augustinian theologian
 Henry of Marcy (c. 1136–1189), also known as Henricus Albanensis, Henricus Cisterciensis, etc., Cistercian abbot and Cardinal Bishop of Albano
 Henry of Latvia (before 1188–after 1259) (in Latin: Henricus de Lettis), Roman Catholic priest, missionary and historian from Magdeburg
 Henry of Segusio (c. 1200–1271), also known as Henricus de Segusio, Italian canonist
 Henry of Settimello (in Latin: Henricus Septimellensis), late 12th-century Italian poet
 Henry Aristippus (1105 to 1110–1162), religious scholar and Archdeacon of Catania
 Henry Bate of Mechelen (1246–after 1310), also known as Henricus Batenus, Flemish philosopher, theologian, astronomer, astrologer, poet, and musician
 Heinrich Blyssen (1526–1586) (in Latin: Henricus Blissemius), German Jesuit controversialist against the Hussites of Bohemia
 Harry van Bommel (born 1962), Dutch politician, anti-globalization activist and former educator
 Johann Heinrich Bösenselle (died 1767) (in Latin: Henricus Antonius Bösenselle), lawyer, professor of law and Rector of the University of Olomouc
 Henricus Canisius (1562–1610), Dutch canonist and historian
 Enrico Dandolo (1107?–1205), Latinized as Henricus Dandulus, 42nd Doge of Venice
 Harry Droog (born 1944), Dutch retired rower
 Henk van Gerven (born 1955), Dutch politician and physician
 Henricus Grammateus (1495–1525 or 1526), German mathematician
 Henricus von Gunterrodt, author of a treatise on fencing published in 1579
 Hendrik Herp (died 1477) (in Latin: Henricus Herpius or Harpius), Flemish Franciscan
 Hendrik Hondius I (1573–1650), Flemish engraver, cartographer and publisher
 Henricus Hondius II (1597–1651), Dutch engraver, cartographer and publisher, unrelated to the above
 Henricus Hornkens (died 1612), Roman Catholic priest and lexicographer
 Servais Knaven (born 1971), Dutch retired cyclist
 Heinrich Kramer (c. 1430–1505), Latinized as Henricus Institor, German churchman and inquisitor
 Heinrich Isaac (c. 1450–1517), Netherlandish Renaissance composer
 Henri Justel (1620–1693), also known as Henricus Justellus, French scholar and royal administrator
 Henk Kamp (born 1952), Dutch politician and Minister of Economic Affairs
 Hans Kuypers (1925–1989), Dutch neuroscientist
 Harry Lubse (born 1951), Dutch retired footballer
 Henricus Martellus Germanus, Latinized name of Heinrich Hammer, German geographer and cartographer who worked in Florence from 1480 to 1496
 Henricus Madathanus, pseudonym of Adrian von Mynsicht (1603–1638), German alchemist
 Han van Meegeren (1889–1947), Dutch painter and notorious art forger
 Hans van Mierlo (1931–2010), Dutch politician, party leader, Deputy Prime Minister, Minister of Defense and Minister of Foreign Affairs of the Netherlands
 Herkus Monte (died 1273) (in Latin: Henricus Montemin), the most famous leader of the Great Prussian Uprising against the Teutonic Knights and Northern Crusaders
 Henricus Münstermann (c. 1470–1537), German Roman Catholic priest and Abbot of Marienfeld
 Henk Nieuwkamp (born 1942), Dutch retired cyclist
 Harry Peeters (1931–2012), Dutch historian, psychologist and academic
 Heinrich Petraeus (1589–1620), German physician and writer
 Henricus Petrus (1508–1579), Swiss printer
 Henricus Regius (1598–1679), Dutch philosopher, physician and professor of medicine
 Henricus Reneri (1593–1639), Dutch philosopher
 H. G. van de Sande Bakhuyzen (1838–1923), Dutch astronomer
 Henrich Smet (1535 or 1537–1614), also known as Henricus Smetius Alostanus or Henricus Smetius a Leda, Flemish physician and humanist scholar
 Henk van Spaandonck (1913–1982), Dutch footballer
 Henri Estienne (1528 or 1531–1598), also known as Henricus Stephanus, French printer and classical scholar
 Henri Valois (1603–1676), also known as Henricus Valesius, French philologist and historian
 Rick VandenHurk (born 1985), Dutch baseball pitcher in Japan
 Henricus van de Wetering (1850–1929), Dutch Archbishop of Utrecht and Primate of the Netherlands
 Henricus Franciscus Wiertz (1784–1858), painter from the Northern Netherlands
 Hendrick Zwaardecroon (1667–1728), Governor-General of the Dutch East Indies

Dutch masculine given names
Latin masculine given names